James Randolph Vigne FSA (1928 – 19 June 2016) was a South African anti-apartheid activist. He was an influential member of the Liberal Party of South Africa, a founding member of the National Committee for Liberation, and the founder of the African Resistance Movement (ARM).

Biography
Vigne was born in 1928 in Kimberley, Northern Cape, attended primary school in Port Elizabeth and did his high schooling at St. Andrew's College, Grahamstown, where he enjoyed a spell as head boy at the age of 13 in 1941. That same year he joined the Van Riebeeck Society. He did his higher education at Wadham College, Oxford, after which he returned to Cape Town and served as English editor at the publisher Maskew Miller until 1964.

Vigne was banned for five years in 1963 under the Suppression of Communism Act, for his activities in Transkei in organising opposition to the Transkei Bantustan. He went into exile in Britain in 1964, where he founded the Namibia Support Committee. For a period he was a member of the Pan Africanist Congress. He wrote widely on South Africa and Namibian politics and history.

He served as a director of the French Hospital for some thirty years and was its treasurer for ten.

Vigne died in Canterbury, England, on 19 June 2016.

Published works

Honours and awards

In April 2010 Vigne was awarded the Order of Luthuli in Silver for "his contribution to the struggle for a democratic, free and non-racial South Africa".

Notes and references

Sources

External links
Profile on SA History Online

1928 births
2016 deaths
Alumni of St. Andrew's College, Grahamstown
South African political philosophers
Alumni of Wadham College, Oxford
Liberal Party of South Africa politicians
Fellows of the Society of Antiquaries of London
Members of the Order of Luthuli